The Estonian Pirate Party is a support group to form a political party in Estonia.  Based on the model of the Swedish Pirate Party, it supports intellectual property reform, freedom of speech and respect for privacy.  The party was founded on 26 June 2009 in Tartu, and is a member of Pirate Parties International.

The party was not active in public after its formation at the end of 2009, only posting some news on its Twitter feed and a Facebook page displaying some information, the web site was lost in the Estonian Internet domain reform in 2011. As of 18 March 2012 the Estonian Pirate Party has elected a new board and has restored the Pirate party web page.

Some of the prominent people involved in Estonian Pirate Party include (among others): Raul Kübarsepp, Meelis Kaldalu, Andres Laiapea, Olev Vaher and 2019 board members Margus Toots, Gamithra Marga and Märt Põder.

References

External links
 

Estonia
Political parties in Estonia
2009 establishments in Estonia
Internet privacy organizations
Internet-related activism
Computer law organizations
Intellectual property activism
Privacy organizations
Civil liberties advocacy groups
Intellectual property organizations
Digital rights organizations